USS Hiwassee (AOG-29) was a Mettawee-class gasoline tanker acquired by the U.S. Navy for the dangerous task of transporting gasoline to warships in the fleet, and to remote Navy stations.

Hiwassee, a motor gasoline tanker, was launched 30 August 1944 under Maritime Commission contract by East Coast Shipyard, Inc., Bayonne, New Jersey; sponsored by Miss Harriet Savage; acquired 17 October 1944 and commissioned 24 October 1944.

World War II service 

Following shakedown training Hiwassee sailed through the Panama Canal to join the giant U.S. Pacific Fleet for the final phases of its island campaign, carrying her precious aviation gasoline and lubricating oil.

She arrived Ulithi 1 April 1945, the day of the landings on Okinawa, and departed 24 April for that important island. Arriving 1 May, the ship began shuttling gasoline ashore, protected from the numerous air attacks by smoke screen. She remained off Okinawa after it was secured and until decommissioning 20 February 1946.

Assigned to the U.S. Army 

Hiwassee was turned over to the Army at Okinawa for use there.

Final decommissioning 

Hiwassee was repossessed by the Navy at Subic Bay, Philippines, 25 March 1947. The tanker was subsequently sold (date unknown) to Luzon Stevedoring Co. Fate: unknown.

Military awards and honors 

Hiwassee received one battle star for World War II service.

References

External links 
 NavSource Online: Service Ship Photo Archive - AOG-29 Hiwassee

 

Mettawee-class gasoline tankers
Type T1-M-A2 tankers of the United States Navy
Ships built in Bayonne, New Jersey
1944 ships
World War II auxiliary ships of the United States